Gavin Scooter St Pier (born January 1967) is an elected Deputy in the States of Guernsey and former president of the Policy and Resources Committee.

Political appointments
He was elected at the general election on 18 April 2012 as a deputy for St Sampson's District.

He served as Minister of Treasury and Resources from May 2012 – May 2016.

He was re-elected at the 2016 General Election with a reduced vote.

After the third secret ballot he was elected in May 2016 as president of the Policy and Resources Committee.

In August 2020, St Pier formed the Guernsey Partnership of Independents party with Heidi Soulsby and Lyndon Trott.

Re-elected at the 2020 General Election, coming in first with the highest number of votes.

Personal life
Married with three children, he has lived in Saint Sampson, Guernsey since 1997.

He qualified as a Chartered Accountant, Chartered Tax Adviser and as a Barrister.

References

External links 
 
 States of Guernsey profile

Living people
Members of the States of Guernsey
Presidents of the Policy and Resources Committee of Guernsey
1967 births